The following highways are numbered 488:

Canada
Manitoba Provincial Road 488

Japan
 Japan National Route 488

United States
  Maryland Route 488
  Mississippi Highway 488
  Nevada State Route 488
  New York State Route 488
  Pennsylvania Route 488
  Puerto Rico Highway 488